Luckee is a 2019 Indian Marathi-language romantic comedy film directed by Sanjay Jadhav. It stars Abhay Mahajan and Deepti Sati in lead roles. It is being produced by Sanjay Kukreja & Suraj Singh's Blive Productions & Music and Deepak Pandurang Rane's Dreaming 24/7 entertainment. It is confirmed for release on 7 February 2019.

This film revolving around four friends is set to make you jump on your feet with laughter, push you back with a little 'aww' for our lead Luckee.

Plot
A 21-year-old comes from a humble background and is ironically named Luckee. He indeed is Luckee but mind you, he is Lucky for people around him. Very naturally, despite of being friends with majority of girls in his college, he can't get ahead, "the friend-zoned for life" tag! He has a crush on Jiya and continues to hunt for chances to impress his lady- love. But, life is never too easy for Luckee. Amidst Luckee's daily struggles to woo her, college announces its annual trip. On the tour group, there is Jiya, Luckee's love interest. What happens during the college's annual trip forms the crux of the story.

Cast 
 Abhay Mahajan as Luckee
 Deepti Sati as Jiya
 Mayur More as Sanket
 Shubhangi Tamble as Shruti
 Mehul Jangli as Gaurav
 Kamesh as Nikhil
 Sanika Ghaises as Prachi
 Rutuja Kulkarni as Rutuja

Production 
Principal photography on the film began in September 2017 and wrapped up in April 2018. It is confirmed for release on 7 February 2019.

Marketing and release 
The first look official poster of the film released on 3 July 2018 and announced a release date of 7 December 2018. Which later got changed to 7 February 2019.

Two new theatrical posters revealing looks of lead actors of the film unveiled for the public on 9 and 15 January 2019. The Trailer Announcement was made on 14 January 2019. The official trailer of the film was released on 16 January 2019.

Soundtrack

References 

Indian romantic comedy films
2010s Marathi-language films
2019 romantic comedy films
Indian sex comedy films